is a railway station in Kashiwazaki, Niigata, Japan, operated by East Japan Railway Company (JR East).

Lines
Nagatori Station is served by the Shin'etsu Main Line and is 50.8 kilometers from the terminus of the line at Naoetsu Station.

Station layout

The station consists of on ground-level island platforms connected to the station building by an underground passage, serving two tracks. The station is unattended.

Platforms

History
Nagatori Station opened on 15 December 1953. With the privatization of Japanese National Railways (JNR) on 1 April 1987, the station came under the control of JR East.

Surrounding area
The station is located in an isolated rural area, with few inhabitants. Niigata Prefectural Route 11 is near the station.

See also
 List of railway stations in Japan

External links

 JR East station information 

Railway stations in Niigata Prefecture
Railway stations in Japan opened in 1953
Shin'etsu Main Line
Stations of East Japan Railway Company
Kashiwazaki, Niigata